Emilio Hassan Viades Slim (born 10 January 1978) is a Mexican former footballer who played for Toluca, Necaxa and Cruz Azul in the Mexican First Division.

As defender, he made his debut on 6 September 1999 against Pumas UNAM, a game which resulted in a 2–0 victory for Toluca. Viades played mostly all his career as a left back.

External links
 Emilio Hassan's Statistics
 Profile w/ Pic

1978 births
Living people
Footballers from Mexico City
Deportivo Toluca F.C. players
Club Necaxa footballers
Cruz Azul footballers
Liga MX players
Mexican people of Lebanese descent
Mexican footballers
Association football defenders
Sportspeople of Lebanese descent